Mujhey Pyar Hua Tha is a 2022 Pakistani television series, written by Sidra Seher Imran and directed by Badar Mehmood. It is produced by Fahad Mustafa and Dr. Ali Kazmi under Big Bang Entertainment. The serial starring Wahaj Ali, Hania Aamir and Zaviyar Naumaan. The story of love, trust and betrayal which revolves around main characters.

The serial become a hit in Pakistan and India and trended on YouTube in both the countries, garnering million of views on each episode.

Cast
Wahaj Ali  as Saad
Hania Aamir as Maheer
Zaviyar Naumaan as Areeb
Rabya Kulsoom as Neelo, Saad's sister
Salma Hassan as Rafia, Maheer's mother
Shahood Alvi as Azhar, Maheer's father 
Noor ul Hassan as Saad's father 
Shaheen Khan as Saad's mother
Javed Sheikh as Areeb's father 
Angeline Malik as Areeb's mother
Sabeena Syed as Anabia
Washma Fatima
Ayesha Mirza
Salma Hassan
Ambar Khan

References

External Links

2022 Pakistani television series debuts